Lyman is a town in Uinta County, Wyoming, United States. The population was 2,115 at the 2010 census.

Geography
Lyman is located at  (41.327817, -110.294111).

Demographics

2010 census
As of the census of 2010, there were 2,115 people, 744 households, and 566 families living in the town. The racial makeup of the town was 97.3% White, 0.1% African American, 0.6% Native American, 0.1% Asian, 0.1% Pacific Islander, 0.7% from other races, and 1.0% from two or more races. Hispanic or Latino of any race were 3.8% of the population.

There were 744 households, of which 41.7% had children under the age of 18 living with them, 65.2% were married couples living together, 7.1% had a female householder with no husband present, 3.8% had a male householder with no wife present, and 23.9% were non-families. 20.3% of all households were made up of individuals, and 7% had someone living alone who was 65 years of age or older. The average household size was 2.84 and the average family size was 3.31.

The median age in the town was 32.6 years. 32.9% of residents were under the age of 18; 8.1% were between the ages of 18 and 24; 24.2% were from 25 to 44; 26.3% were from 45 to 64; and 8.5% were 65 years of age or older. The gender makeup of the town was 50.4% male and 49.6% female.

2000 census
As of the census of 2000, there were 1,938 people, 640 households, and 504 families living in the town. The population density was 1,326.7 people per square mile (512.5/km2). There were 708 housing units at an average density of 484.7 per square mile (187.2/km2). The racial makeup of the town was 98.30% White, 0.41% Native American, 0.10% Asian, 0.05% Pacific Islander, 0.62% from other races, and 0.52% from two or more races. Hispanic or Latino of any race were 2.53% of the population.

There were 640 households, out of which 47.3% had children under the age of 18 living with them, 64.2% were married couples living together, 9.1% had a female householder with no husband present, and 21.1% were non-families. 18.4% of all households were made up of individuals, and 6.3% had someone living alone who was 65 years of age or older. The average household size was 3.03 and the average family size was 3.48.

In the town, the population was spread out, with 36.5% under the age of 18, 10.5% from 18 to 24, 24.8% from 25 to 44, 22.0% from 45 to 64, and 6.2% who were 65 years of age or older. The median age was 28 years. For every 100 females, there were 106.4 males. For every 100 females age 18 and over, there were 96.3 males.

The median income for a household in the town was $50,550, and the median income for a family was $55,132. Males had a median income of $51,042 versus $17,917 for females. The per capita income for the town was $17,966. About 5.7% of families and 7.3% of the population were below the poverty line, including 8.7% of those under age 18 and 6.3% of those age 65 or over.

Education
Children aged five years old and up attend Urie Elementary School (Grades K-4), and Lyman High School (Grades 9-12), once they have progressed through Lyman Intermediate School (Grades 5–8).

Lyman has a public library, a branch of the Uinta County Library System.

See also

 List of municipalities in Wyoming

References

External links

 

Towns in Wyoming
Towns in Uinta County, Wyoming